Senator Angel may refer to:

Denise Harper Angel (born 1953), Kentucky State Senate
Jan Angel, Washington State Senate
Wilkes Angel (1817–1889), New York State Senate

See also
Homer D. Angell (1875–1968), Oregon State Senate